Kushkabad (also Romanized as Kūshkābād; also known as Gūshkābād) is a village in Kardeh Rural District, in the Central District of Mashhad County, Razavi Khorasan Province, Iran. At the 2006 census, its population was 331, in 90 families.

References 

Populated places in Mashhad County